The 1989 Northeastern United States tornado outbreak was a series of tornadoes which caused more than $130 million (1989 USD) in damage across the Northeastern United States on July 10, 1989. Several towns in New York and Connecticut were particularly hard-hit. Several homes were leveled in Schoharie, New York and extensive damage occurred in Bantam, Connecticut. A large section of Hamden, Connecticut, including an industrial park and hundreds of homes, was destroyed; and in some places buildings were flattened to the ground.

More than 150 people were injured by the tornado outbreak, and one person was killed by straight-line thunderstorm winds. While tornado outbreaks in this area are unusual, this storm was especially rare in that it produced six significant tornadoes, two of which were violent F4s, and featured many tornadoes with tracks of several miles.



List of official tornadoes

Storm details

Storms began causing damage early in the morning on July 10, 1989. A tornado briefly touched down in Ogdensburg, New York at 5AM, injuring one person. Hail up to 1 in (25 mm) wide, wind gusts over 50 mph (80 km/h), and many reports of wind damage were reported in New York, Vermont, and Massachusetts before noon. Severe weather is an unusual occurrence in the morning, and the activity only increased in severity towards the middle of the afternoon.

Schoharie County tornado

The event which devastated areas from Montgomery to Greene County caused $20,000,000 in damage and injured 20 people. While the Storm Prediction Center archives say that it was a single tornado, it was likely three or more tornadoes, each producing F3 to F4 damage. Only damage near Schoharie was at the F4 level, and some sources doubt it even reached that intensity at all.

The first tornado touched down three miles east of Ames at 1:27PM, moving southeast.  It passed near or through the towns of Carlisle, Howe Caverns, Central Bridge, and Schoharie before lifting. Continuing southeast for 10 miles, the storm produced another tornado briefly near Rensselaerville. After another 10 miles, a third tornado touched down between Greenville and Surprise. This final section of the path is plotted as a skipping tornado, but may have been three or more separate tornadoes.

Connecticut tornado family

An hour after the previous event caused destruction in Upstate New York, a new tornado family began producing significant damage in the adjacent state of Connecticut. The first tornado, which may have been three separate tornadoes, started its path of destruction in Cornwall, leveling a virgin forest known as Cathedral Pines. At the nearby Mohawk Mountain Ski Area, every ski lift was destroyed, with some lift chairs found miles away. The tornado continued south-southeast through Milton, leveling hundreds more trees, and destroyed the village of Bantam before dissipating. Strong downburst winds continued to cause damage and level trees after this tornado lifted: it was during this period between tornadoes that a 12-year-old girl was killed by falling trees in Black Rock State Park.

Soon afterwards, another tornado touched down in Watertown, passing through Oakville and northern Waterbury, damaging or destroying 150 homes.

The Hamden tornado was by far the most destructive tornado of this family, and possibly the most damaging of the entire outbreak. It touched down at 5:38 pm near the Wilbur Cross Parkway. Industrial cranes and cars were tossed through the air, and rows of houses, as well as an industrial park, were flattened. The tornado lifted just a few minutes later at 5:45. The damage path was only five miles long, stopping just short of the city of New Haven, but it damaged or destroyed almost 400 structures in its path.

The storm was so intense at this point that an 80 mph (130 km/h) wind gust was measured in downtown New Haven after the tornado dissipated. About the same time, a tornado struck the area between Carmel and Brewster, New York, unroofing a condominium complex.  Five people were injured.

Long Island

The storms continued to produce damage after crossing onto Long Island.  An F2 tornado caused significant damage in the town of East Moriches.  A man was thrown with his trailer across an airfield; he escaped the destroyed trailer with only minor injuries. The tornado was accompanied by 2.5 inch (6.4 cm) hail. Other areas further east also saw straight-line wind damage and hail up to an inch across.

Massachusetts storms

While the destructive tornadoes were affecting Connecticut, this part of the storm produced four brief F1 tornadoes in quick succession north of Worcester, which occurred between 4PM and 4:15PM. These tornadoes each produced damage paths less than 150 feet (45 m) wide, and less than 0.5 miles (0.8 km) long.

Moving east-southeast into southern Middlesex County, it continued producing severe winds (gusting up to 90 mph; 145 km/h) and very heavy rain. Another tornado touched down very briefly in Norfolk County, followed by two more brief touchdowns in Plymouth County near 5:30PM. The storm then weakened, but still managed to produce 60 mph (95 km/h) winds on Cape Cod, before finally moving out into the Atlantic and dissipating.

New Jersey storms

Around the same time, the last of the activity was affecting areas of northern New Jersey.  Two F0s and an F1 tracked through parts of Passaic and Bergen counties, snapping and uprooting trees, and causing $4 million in damage.  About 150 houses were damaged in Bergen county alone.

Aftermath
In Waterbury, Connecticut, mayor Joseph Santopietro declared a state of emergency due to extensive damage in the city.

In Hamden, Connecticut, the National Guard was called in to aid in cleanup and keep order, as some looting was reported in the devastated area. President George H. W. Bush declared the area a disaster area on July 18. The damage was so intense that much of the area was without power for a week, and trees were still being cleared a year later.

There was some damage to homes and other structures from this storm, but most damage was confined to wooded areas. Several major roads, including Route 9, Route 12, and Interstate 190, were closed due to flooding or downed trees. The main financial impact was from damage to utilities, which totalled over $2 million in Princeton alone.

Despite the extensive and widespread damage, only one death was reported from the entire severe weather outbreak, and this was due to straight-line winds, not a tornado. Many people, including Connecticut Governor William O'Neill, commented that it was "a miracle" that more people were not seriously injured or killed.

Historic outbreak
This storm event was one of the most extensive ever seen in the Northeastern United States. In all, 17 tornadoes touched down, possibly more. There were 14 instances of measured severe winds (several over 80 mph, 129 km/h), along with 46 reports of straight-line wind damage. There were 10 reports of hail 1 inch (2.5 cm) across or larger, and hail 2.5 inches (6.4 cm) wide fell from one storm, which was producing a tornado at the time.  Hail this large is especially rare in this area of the United States.

Remarkably, though hundreds of homes and other structures were leveled, no one was killed by tornadoes that day. Tornado damage caused about 140 injuries, mostly minor, and one death and 11 injuries were caused by wind damage. In just five hours, the storms produced more than 12,500 lightning strikes. The airport in Oxford, Connecticut recorded 4.4 inches (112 mm) of rain in just 30 minutes. While the northeastern United States experiences occasional tornadoes, an event of this scale is especially rare. Typical tornadoes in this area are short-lived and not particularly damaging. This outbreak featured several long-lived tornadoes, produced by storms which also produced destructive straight-line winds over a large area. Since 1950, only six violent tornadoes have occurred in the Northeastern US, two of which were part of this outbreak. It was by far the worst tornado event in the area since May 2, 1983 when six significant tornadoes tore through New York.

See also
Flint-Worcester tornado outbreak sequence
List of Connecticut tornadoes
Late-May 1998 tornado outbreak and derecho
List of North American tornadoes and tornado outbreaks
List of New Jersey tornadoes

References 

F4 tornadoes by date
Tornadoes of 1989
Tornadoes in New York (state)
Tornadoes in Massachusetts
Tornadoes in Connecticut
Tornadoes in New Jersey
History of the Northeastern United States
Northeastern United States Tornado Outbreak, 1989
Northeastern United States tornado outbreak